4,5-MDO-DiPT, or 4,5-methylenedioxy-N,N-diisopropyltryptamine, is a lesser-known psychedelic drug.  It is the 4,5-methylenedioxy analog of DiPT. 4,5-MDO-DiPT was first synthesized by Alexander Shulgin. In his book TiHKAL (Tryptamines I Have Known and Loved), 4,5-MDO-DiPT produces slight LSD-like effects after several hours.  Very little data exists about the pharmacological properties, metabolism, and toxicity of 4,5-MDO-DiPT.

See also 
 4,5-DHP-DMT
 4,5-MDO-DMT
 5,6-MDO-DiPT
 Tryptamine
 DiPT
 Psychedelics, dissociatives and deliriants

External links 
 4,5-MDO-DiPT Entry in TIHKAL
 4,5-MDO-DIPT Entry in TiHKAL • info

Psychedelic tryptamines
Diisopropylamino compounds